Saturnia is a genus of moths in the family Saturniidae first described by Franz Paula von Schrank in 1802. They are large moths, commonly called emperor moths though this is also used for various close relatives in subfamily Saturniinae. Most are Palearctic, but three species (S. mendocino, S. walterorum and S. albofasciata, commonly known as saturnia moths) occur in the chaparral of California.

Species
The known species of Saturnia are:
 Saturnia albofasciata (Johnson, 1938) – white-streaked saturnia (mostly in Calosaturnia)
 Saturnia atlantica Lucas, 1848
 Saturnia bieti Oberthür, 1886
 Saturnia cameronensis Lemaire, 1979
 Saturnia centralis Naumann & Loeffler, 2005
 Saturnia cephalariae (Romanoff, 1885) (sometimes in Eudia)
 Saturnia cidosa Moore, 1865
 Saturnia cognata Jordan in Seitz, 1911
 Saturnia koreanis Brechlin, 2009
 Saturnia luctifera Jordan in Seitz, 1911
 Saturnia mendocino Behrens, 1876 – Mendocino saturnia (mostly in Calosaturnia)
 Saturnia pavonia (Linnaeus, 1758) – small emperor moth (sometimes in Eudia)
 Saturnia pavoniella (Scopoli, 1763) (sometimes in Eudia)
 Saturnia pinratanai Lampe, 1989
 Saturnia pyri (Denis & Schiffermüller, 1775) – giant emperor moth, Viennese emperor moth
 Saturnia spini (Denis & Schiffermuller, 1775) – sloe emperor moth (sometimes in Eudia)
 Saturnia taibaishanis Brechlin, 2009
 Saturnia walterorum Hogue & Johnson, 1958 – Walter's saturnia (mostly in Calosaturnia)
 Saturnia zuleika Hope, 1843

Formerly placed here was the Brazilian Arsenura pandora. Whether the autumn emperor moth (Perisomena caecigena), here separated in a monotypic genus, is not actually better included in Saturnia needs to be determined; the same goes for the genus Neoris.

References